This is the discography of American electronic dance music producer and DJ Jauz.

Studio albums

Compilation albums

Extended plays

Charted singles

Singles

Remixes

References 

Discographies of American artists
Electronic music discographies